Sphenacanthus (from  , 'wedge' and  , 'spine') is an extinct genus of a chondrichtyan xenacanthiform that belongs to the Sphenacanthidae family and lived from the Late Devonian, through Carboniferous until the Late Permian period in Scotland, Spain, Russia and Brazil. It lived 359 million years ago, and probably it was one of the first member of the elasmobranchians, the lineage that leads to the modern sharks. Sphenacanthus probably hunts small fishes and, unlike their modern-day relatives, its inhabited fresh water lagoons. Sphenacanthus had seven fins, two in the upper part and five in the underside, and it had a heterodont dentition and mandibles relatively long and deeper. Sphenacanthus serrulatus is still only known from incomplete neurocranial remains and associated dermal material. These suggest that it was a relatively large shark, probably well over one meter in length when fully grown. Its body form was probably similar to that of other phalacanthous sharks.

Paleobiology 
Sphenacanthus was discovered in Carboniferous terrains of Scotland (Visén Oil Shale Groups), in the United Kingdom, in ancient fresh water systems, a habitat that also is known in the Paraná Basin in Brazil (Rio do Rasto Formation). Another findings, like those of the Puertollano Bason in Spain suggests that also it lived in zones of marine influence, in brackish waters. It shared its environment with other primitive sharks, including to Xenacanthus of one meter in length and the similar species, Tristychius arcuatus.  It is possible that Sphenacanthus may have preyed on its smaller relatives.

References

Further reading 
 Chahud, A.; Fairchild, T.R. & Petri, S. 2010. Chondrichthyans from the base of the Irati Formation (Early Permian, Paraná Basin), São Paulo, Brazil. Gondwana Research, 18:528-537.doi:10.1016/j.gr.2010.01.006
 Silva-Santos, R. 1946. Duas novas formas de Elasmobrânquios do Paleozóico do Meio Norte, Brasil. Anais da Academia Brasileira de Ciências, 18:281-287.
 Silva-Santos, R. 1947. Um Ctenacanthus do Gondwana brasileiro. Anais da Academia Brasileira de Ciências, 19:247-253.

Prehistoric cartilaginous fish genera
Devonian sharks
Carboniferous sharks
Permian sharks
Carboniferous fish of Europe
Prehistoric fish of South America
Permian Brazil
Fossils of Brazil
Fossil taxa described in 1837
Taxa named by Louis Agassiz